Baker Lake is an alpine lake in Custer County, Idaho, United States, located in the White Cloud Mountains in the Sawtooth National Recreation Area. The name is derived from the fact that the lake is adjacent to mining claims held by the Baker family for many years.

Baker Lake is just east of Merriam Peak and downstream of several other lakes including Castle, Cornice, Emerald, Glacier, Noisy, Quiet, Rock, Scree, and Shallow Lakes.  The lake is accessed from Sawtooth National Forest trail 047.

See also
List of lakes of the White Cloud Mountains
Born Lakes
Chamberlain Basin
Sawtooth National Recreation Area
White Cloud Mountains

References

Lakes of Idaho
Lakes of Custer County, Idaho
Glacial lakes of the United States
Glacial lakes of the Sawtooth National Forest